The Cabrillo Formation is a Maastrichtian stage geologic formation in coastal San Diego County, southern California. It is part of the Rosario Group. The Maastrichtian stage is of the Late Cretaceous Epoch, during the Mesozoic Era.  

The formation is found on the eastern and southwestern sides of the   Point Loma peninsula including in Cabrillo National Monument, and on Mount Soledad, both within the city of San Diego.

The Cabrillo Formation overlies the Point Loma Formation.

Fossils
A single tooth from the cartilaginous fish Squalicorax has been recovered from the Cabrillo Formation sediments of Cabrillo National Monument.

See also

References

Further reading
 

Cretaceous California
Maastrichtian Stage of North America
Geology of San Diego County, California
Geography of San Diego
Point Loma, San Diego
Upper Cretaceous Series of North America
Geologic formations of California